Aprosphylus hybridus, the Namibian black-kneed katydid, is a species of katydid that is endemic to southern Namibia.

References

Insects described in 1888
Tettigoniidae